Geoffrey Michael Petrie (born April 17, 1948) is an American former professional basketball player. A native of Pennsylvania, he played professional basketball in the National Basketball Association (NBA) for the Portland Trail Blazers where he won NBA Rookie of the Year in 1971. After retirement as a player he entered management, and was the President of Basketball Operations for the Sacramento Kings in the NBA until June 2013.

Early life
Geoff Petrie was born in Darby, Pennsylvania, on April 17, 1948. He attended Springfield High School, in Springfield, Pennsylvania, and played collegiate ball at Princeton University.

In Petrie's sophomore season at Princeton, the team was co-champion of the Ivy League with a 20–6 (12-3 Ivy) record.  Despite the fact that Princeton had three of the five first-team All-Ivy team members, including Petrie plus second-team member John Hummer, they lost the one-game league playoff to the Jim McMillian–led 1968 Columbia Lions men's basketball team.  That year the team rose to as high as 8th in the AP Poll.  The following season, Petrie led the Ivy League in scoring (23.9 points/game in conference games), and the team accumulated a 19–7 (14–0) record, including an appearance in the 1969 NCAA Men's Division I Basketball Tournament.  They lost to St. John's in the tournament, but Petrie was again on the first-team All-Ivy squad.  As a senior, Petrie was second-team All-Ivy, but the Tigers placed third in the conference to the undefeated (in Ivy League games) Corky Calhoun-led Penn Quakers men's basketball team and McMillian's Lions.  Although Princeton did not appear in the 1970 NCAA Men's Division I Basketball Tournament, they hosted Penn's game.  All three of his varsity years were spent under head coach Pete Carril.  Petrie was co-captain of the 1969–70 team with classmate Hummer.  Petrie was All-East both as a junior and a senior.

Petrie scored 1321 points in college, third in school history at the end of his career in 1970 and still seventh after the 2009–10 season.  His 541 in 1968–69 was fourth to each of Bill Bradley's single-season totals until Brian Taylor moved him down to sixth where he still stands. He continued to rank fourth in school history with an 18.3 points/game average through the 2009–10 season.  His 1969–70 single season average of 22.3 is sixth behind only Bradley and Taylor and his 20.8 average the prior year stands eighth.  His 530 career field goal stands fourth on the school list behind Bradley Kit Mueller and Craig Robinson.  216 field goals in 1968–69 ranks fifth behind Bradley and Taylor, while his 189 the following year ranks eighth.  17 made against Fordham, January 26, 1970, trails only Bradley's three best nights.

Professional career

Player
At 6'4" he could play either guard or forward positions and was a long range shooter. He played in two All-Star games and in 1971, the Trail Blazers' first year in existence, was named co-Rookie of the Year with the Boston Celtics' Dave Cowens after averaging 24.8 points per game. The Associated Press reported Petrie's salary during his rookie season was around $80,000.

Until Damon Stoudamire's 54 point performance in 2005, Petrie held the Trail Blazers' individual scoring record for one game at 51 — a feat he accomplished twice. His jersey number, 45, was retired by the Trail Blazers. Following the 1975–76 NBA season he was traded to the Atlanta Hawks in a transaction that landed Portland Maurice Lucas. Petrie did not play any games for the Hawks after suffering a career-ending knee injury.

Petrie is credited as the first NBA player to switch from Converse brand athletic shoe, which were popular in the 1970s, to Nike brand.

Post-playing career

Petrie worked in the private sector for several years after leaving the NBA, and in 1985 began working for the Trail Blazers. He worked as a commentator for Blazer radio broadcasts and several other positions before being hired as senior vice president for operations. He left Portland in 1994 and was hired by the Sacramento Kings as president of basketball operations. As an executive he won the NBA Executive of the Year Award twice with the Kings, first in 1999 and again in 2001.

On December 29, 2009, Petrie received a three-year extension as team president through the 2012–13 season. On June 17, 2013, Petrie was replaced as team president of the Kings by Pete D'Alessandro.

NBA career statistics

Regular season

|-
| style="text-align:left;"|
| style="text-align:left;"|Portland
| 82 || – || 37.0 || .443 || – || .722 || 3.4 || 4.8 || – || – || 24.8
|-
| style="text-align:left;"|
| style="text-align:left;"|Portland
| 60 || – || 35.9 || .417 || – || .789 || 2.2 || 4.1 || – || – || 18.9
|-
| style="text-align:left;"|
| style="text-align:left;"|Portland
| 79 || – || 39.7 || .464 || – || .778 || 3.5 || 4.4 || – || – || 24.9
|-
| style="text-align:left;"|
| style="text-align:left;"|Portland
| 73 || – || 38.4 || .481 || – || .853 || 2.8 || 4.3 || 1.2 || 0.2 || 24.3
|-
| style="text-align:left;"|
| style="text-align:left;"|Portland
| 80 || – || 38.9 || .456 || – || .839 || 2.6 || 5.3 || 1.0 || 0.2 || 18.3
|-
| style="text-align:left;"|
| style="text-align:left;"|Portland
| 72 || – || 35.5 || .461 || – || .829 || 2.3 || 4.6 || 1.1 || 0.1 || 18.9
|- class="sortbottom"
| style="text-align:center;" colspan="2"|Career
| 446 || – || 37.6 || .455 || – || .805 || 2.8 || 4.6 || 1.1 || 0.1 || 21.8
|- class="sortbottom"
| style="text-align:center;" colspan="2"|All-Star
| 2 || 1 || 15.5 || .214 || – || 1.000 || 1.0 || 2.5 || 0.5 || 0.0 || 4.0

References

External links

1948 births
Living people
American men's basketball players
Basketball players from Pennsylvania
National Basketball Association All-Stars
National Basketball Association general managers
National Basketball Association players with retired numbers
People from Darby, Pennsylvania
People from Springfield Township, Delaware County, Pennsylvania
Point guards
Portland Trail Blazers draft picks
Portland Trail Blazers executives
Portland Trail Blazers players
Princeton Tigers men's basketball players
Sacramento Kings executives
Shooting guards
Sportspeople from Delaware County, Pennsylvania